Double Helix Games was an American video game developer based in Irvine, California, founded in October 2007 through the merger of The Collective and Shiny Entertainment, two studios owned by Foundation 9 Entertainment. Double Helix was acquired by Amazon and integrated into Amazon Game Studios in February 2014.

History 
Double Helix Games was formed as the result of a merger between The Collective and Shiny Entertainment, two video game developers owned by Foundation 9 Entertainment. Shiny had been acquired by Foundation 9 in October 2006 under the terms that it would co-locate with the already owned The Collective. On October 9, 2007, it was announced that both studios had relocated to new  offices in Irvine, California, and were being merged, expected to not result in any job losses. The amalgam, led by Michael Persson, received the name "Double Helix Games" in March 2008.

In July 2009, as part of a round of consolidations within Foundation 9, Double Helix suffered an undisclosed number of staff cuts. On February 5, 2014, Double Helix announced that it had been acquired by retailing company Amazon. The studio was integrated into the Irvine location of the retailer's Amazon Game Studios division, which had been established in 2012. Microsoft Studios, the publisher of Double Helix's Killer Instinct, stated that it would be working with a new development partner to continue development on the game.

Games developed

Canceled 
 Harker (2008)

References 

2007 establishments in California
2014 disestablishments in California
2014 mergers and acquisitions
Amazon (company) acquisitions
American companies disestablished in 2014
American companies established in 2007
Companies based in Irvine, California
Defunct companies based in Greater Los Angeles
Defunct video game companies of the United States
Technology companies based in Greater Los Angeles
Video game companies based in California
Video game companies disestablished in 2014
Video game companies established in 2007
Video game development companies